Li Rouping (born 17 September 1982) is a Chinese former synchronized swimmer who competed in the 2000 Summer Olympics.

References

1982 births
Living people
Chinese synchronized swimmers
Olympic synchronized swimmers of China
Synchronized swimmers at the 2000 Summer Olympics
Synchronized swimmers from Sichuan
Sportspeople from Chengdu